Celtic Woman: The Greatest Journey is a compilation album by the group Celtic Woman, released on 28 October 2008. It features tracks from their self-titled debut album and A New Journey (despite some having been re-recorded), plus three new tracks.

Performers in The Greatest Journey are vocalists Chloë Agnew, Órla Fallon, Lynn Hilary, Lisa Kelly, Méav Ní Mhaolchatha, Alex Sharpe, Hayley Westenra and fiddler Máiréad Nesbitt.

Track listing

Celtic Woman: The Greatest Journey - The Essential Collection DVD
Celtic Woman: The Greatest Journey - The Essential Collection was released on DVD on 30 January 2008 and features vocalists Chloë Agnew, Órla Fallon, Lisa Kelly, Méav Ní Mhaolchatha, Hayley Westenra and fiddler Máiréad Nesbitt. The DVD follows the same format as the CD by reprising songs from previous concerts at the Helix Theatre in Dublin, Ireland in 2004 and Slane Castle in County Meath, Ireland in 2006. Some of the tracks are presented as montages of footage from both concerts, such as "Orinoco Flow", while others are partially abbreviated, such as "Mo Ghile Mear".

DVD track listing

Personnel 
Per the liner notes:
Featured performers
 Chloë Agnew – vocals
 Órla Fallon – vocals, harp
 Lisa Kelly – vocals
 Lynn Hilary – vocals
 Méav Ní Mhaolchatha – vocals
 Máiréad Nesbitt – fiddle
 Alex Sharpe – vocals
 Hayley Westenra – vocals (uncredited)
Band
 Des Moore – guitar, bouzouki
 Eoghan O'Neill – bass guitar
 John O'Brien – pipes, whistle
 Ray Fean – drums, percussion
 Robbie Casserly – additional percussion
 Nicky Bailey – percussion
 Robbie Harris, Andrew Reilly – bodhrán
 Andreja Malir – harp
 Andrew Boland – pièna-flörten
 David Downes – keyboards, whistles, percussion, backing vocals
The Irish Film Orchestra
 Caitríona Walsh – orchestra contractor
 John Page, David Downes – conductors
 Alan Smale – concertmaster
 Martin Johnston, Bill Butt – solo cello
Aontas Choral Ensemble
 Rosemary Collier – choral director
Discovery Gospel Choir
 Róisin Dexter – conductor
Production
 David Downes – production, arrangements, orchestrations, additional engineering
 Andrew Boland – engineering, mixing
 Recorded at Corrig Sound, Windmill Lane Studios 1 & 2 and RTÉ Studio 1, Dublin, Ireland
 Mixed at Windmill Lane Studios, Dublin, Ireland
 Mastered at Joe Gastwirt at Gastwirt Mastering, Los Angeles, United States

Chart history

Certifications

References

Celtic Woman albums
2008 compilation albums
Manhattan Records albums